Genbu may refer to:
 Black Tortoise, a Chinese constellation symbol
 Genbu (YuYu Hakusho), a fictional character in the series YuYu Hakusho
 Genbu (Fushigi Yūgi), a fictional character in the series Fushigi Yūgi
 Genbu, a fictional monster in the MMORPG Final Fantasy XI.
 Genbu Kururugi, a fictional character in the series Code Geass
 Genbu, the guardian of the North Gate of The Imperial Palace in the series Accel World